Faulhaber is a German surname. Notable people with the surname include:

Gerrit Faulhaber (1912–1951), Indonesian footballer
Johann Faulhaber (1580–1635), German mathematician
Markus Faulhaber (1914–1945), Sturmbannführer in the Waffen SS
Michael von Faulhaber (1869–1952), German Roman Catholic Cardinal

See also
Faulhaber's formula

German-language surnames